In Aristotelian logic, dictum de omni et nullo (Latin: "the maxim of all and none") is the principle that whatever is affirmed or denied of a whole kind K may be affirmed or denied (respectively) of any subkind of K.  This principle is fundamental to syllogistic logic in the sense that all valid syllogistic argument forms are reducible to applications of the two constituent principles dictum de omni and dictum de nullo.

Dictum de omni
Dictum de omni (sometimes misinterpreted as universal instantiation) is the principle that whatever is universally affirmed of a kind is affirmable as well for any subkind of that kind.   

Example:
(1) Dogs are mammals.
(2) Mammals have livers. 
Therefore
(3) dogs have livers.
Premise (1) states that "dog" is a subkind of the kind "mammal".
Premise (2) is a (universal affirmative) claim about the kind "mammal".
Statement  (3) concludes that what is true of the kind "mammal" is true of the subkind "dog".

Dictum de nullo
Dictum de nullo is the related principle that whatever is denied of a kind is likewise denied of any subkind of that kind.

Example:
(1) Dogs are mammals.
(4) Mammals do not have gills.
Therefore
(5) dogs do not have gills.
Premise (1) states that "dog" is a subkind of the kind "mammal".
Premise (4) is a (universal negative) claim about the kind "mammal".
Statement  (5) concludes that what is denied of the kind "mammal" is denied of the subkind "dog".

Each of these two principles is an instance of a valid argument form known as universal hypothetical syllogism in first-order predicate logic.  
In Aristotelean syllogistic, they correspond respectively to the two argument forms, Barbara and Celarent.

See also
Aristotle
Syllogism
Term logic
Class (philosophy)
Class (set theory)
Natural kind
Type (metaphysics)
Downward entailing
Monotonic function

References
 Aristotle, Prior Analytics, 24b, 28–30.

Notes

External links

Latin logical phrases
Arguments
Term logic
Inference